James Rodger "J. R." House (born November 11, 1979) is an American former professional baseball catcher and current third base coach for the Cincinnati Reds of Major League Baseball (MLB). 

A two-sport star in baseball and football in high school, House pursued a professional baseball career after being selected by the Pittsburgh Pirates in the 5th round of the 1999 amateur draft. House left baseball for one year in 2005 to try college football. He enrolled at West Virginia University and made the team as a backup quarterback, but returned to professional baseball after playing sparingly for the Mountaineers.

Early life
A top high school football player at Nitro, J.R. House set a national high school record with 10 touchdown passes in the 1998 West Virginia state championship game against Morgantown. He was the West Virginia high school football player of the year and also set a national record with 14,457 career passing yards. House is now fourth all-time behind Maty Mauk (18,932), Maty's older brother Ben Mauk (17,364) and Chris Leak (15,593). During his high school years, he spent fall semesters playing football at Nitro and spring semesters playing baseball at Seabreeze High School in Ormond Beach, Florida; he moved each winter with his father, who owns automobile dealerships in the Charleston and Daytona Beach areas. J.R House currently holds the West Virginia prep football records for Total Offensive Points in a Season (402 in 1998), Total Offensive Yards in a Season (5,763 in 1998, Total Offensive Yards in a Career (14,170 in 1995 - 1998), Pass Completions in a Game (43 in 1998 WV AAA Title Game), Pass Completions in a Season (425 in 1998), Pass Completions in a Career (1,103 in 1995 - 1998), Pass Attempts in a Season (610 in 1998), Pass Attempts in a Career (1,725 in 1995 - 1998), Passing Yards in a Game (594 in 1998 WV AAA Title Game), Passing Yards in a Season (5,526 in 1998), Passing Yards in a Career (14,457 in 1995 - 1998), Touchdown Passes in a Game (10 in 1998 WV AAA Title Game), Touchdown Passes in a Season (65 in 1998), Touchdown Passes in a Career (145 in 1995 - 1998).

Professional career

House got his pro career off to a good start by hitting over .300 combined in Rookie League and short-season class A in 1999. In 2000, he batted .348 with 23 homers, sharing the South Atlantic League MVP with Josh Hamilton.

House was plagued by illness and injuries during his time in the Pittsburgh Pirates' organization. He missed a month of the 2000 season due to mononucleosis. In 2001, he was twice on the disabled list with bruised ribs. A year later, he had surgery three times - for an abdominal hernia, a torn muscle and Tommy John surgery. He was limited to 35 games in 2002 and 41 in 2003.

Despite the missed playing time in 2003,  House made his major league debut by appearing in one late-season game for Pittsburgh. After batting .288 in 92 AAA games in 2004, he made it back to the big leagues, getting into five games for the Pirates.

But after his sixth season in the Pirates' organization, House was not deemed a top prospect anymore by the Pittsburgh Pirates, who had high hopes for other young catchers Ryan Doumit, Humberto Cota, Ronny Paulino and Neil Walker. Additionally, his throwing ability was limited in 2004 by an injured right arm, requiring rotator cuff surgery. He was subsequently released by the Pirates.

After his baseball career apparently ended, House enrolled at West Virginia University, where he was the third-string quarterback for one season. In 2005, House completed 2 of 4 passes for 38 yards with no touchdowns or interceptions. He also had 2 rushes for 16 yards with a long of 13 yards and no touchdowns.

Deciding to return to baseball in 2006, House signed with the Houston Astros. Assigned to their Corpus Christi Hooks Class AA minor league team, he had two hitting streaks of over 15 games in the first two months of the year and by June 3 was leading the Texas League in batting average.

Soon thereafter, House moved up to the AAA Round Rock Express. On August 21, 2006, he played his last game with Round Rock and was called up to the majors. He saw action in four games for the Astros, going hitless in nine at-bats.

On November 14, 2006, House was signed by the Baltimore Orioles. House played for the Norfolk Tides, their AAA affiliate, for the first three months of the  baseball season. House was recalled by the Orioles on August 13, 2007.

House hit his first career home run off Toronto Blue Jays starting pitcher Jesse Litsch on August 18, 2007. House saw action in 19 games with Baltimore, batting .211 with three home runs. With the conclusion of the regular season, he was outrighted to the minor leagues on October 3. He declined the assignment and elected free agency on October 12.

House returned to the Astros' organization the next season, signing a minor league contract with an invitation to spring training on January 10, 2008. House did not make the Astros' 2008 opening day roster and on March 19, 2008 was sent back to the AAA Round Rock Express in the Pacific Coast League. He was brought up by the Astros on August 16 and appeared in three games, going hitless in three at-bats.

In 2010, House started the season with the Newark Bears of the Atlantic League of Professional Baseball, playing in 16 games. On May 14, he was signed by the New York Mets. He reported to the Mets' Triple A affiliate, the Buffalo Bisons. He played in 67 games for the Bisons, batting .253 with four home runs and 29 runs batted in.

On February 9, 2011, he signed a contract with the Long Island Ducks.

House managed the Hillsboro Hops to the Northwest League championship in 2014. House spent the 2015 and 2016 seasons with the Class A Advanced Visalia Rawhide, earning California League Manager of the Year honors in 2015. After the season was hired by the Cincinnati Reds as 3rd Base and catching coach.

References

External links

West Virginia University athletics profile

1979 births
Living people
Águilas Cibaeñas players
American expatriate baseball players in the Dominican Republic
Altoona Curve players
American football quarterbacks
Baltimore Orioles players
Baseball players from West Virginia
Buffalo Bisons (minor league) players
Cincinnati Reds coaches
Corpus Christi Hooks players
Gulf Coast Pirates players
Hickory Crawdads players
Houston Astros players
Long Island Ducks players
Major League Baseball catchers
Major League Baseball third base coaches
Minor league baseball managers
Nashville Sounds players
Newark Bears players
Nitro High School alumni
Norfolk Tides players
Omaha Royals players
Pittsburgh Pirates players
Players of American football from West Virginia
Round Rock Express players
Seabreeze High School alumni
Sportspeople from Charleston, West Virginia
West Virginia Mountaineers football players
Williamsport Crosscutters players
Gigantes del Cibao players